The Basilica of the Sacred Hearts of Jesus and Mary is a Minor Basilica of the Catholic Church located in the village of Southampton, New York, United States.  It is also a parish church of the Diocese of Rockville Centre.  The Gothic Revival-style church was completed in 1908 for $100,000.  The exterior is covered in white marble.  Pope Benedict XVI decreed on November 11, 2011, that Sacred Hearts of Jesus and Mary Church was elevated to the status of a minor basilica.

References

External links
 shjmbasilica.org

Roman Catholic churches completed in 1908
Sacred Hearts of Jesus and Mary, Southampton
Roman Catholic Diocese of Rockville Centre
Roman Catholic churches in New York (state)
Gothic Revival church buildings in New York (state)
1908 establishments in New York (state)
Southampton (village), New York
20th-century Roman Catholic church buildings in the United States